Mark Jackson (born September 14, 1972) is the athletic director for Villanova University. Previously, Jackson was the senior associate athletic director for the University of Southern California.

Education
Jackson graduated from Xaverian Brothers High School in Westwood, Massachusetts. He then received a bachelor's degree in Government from Colby College where played defensive back on the football team from 1991 to 1994 . Jackson also received a master's degree in Public Policy from Trinity College (Connecticut) in 1997.

Coaching career
Jackson began his coaching career as a graduate assistant at Trinity College (Connecticut) from 1995 to 1996. Jackson joined the New England Patriots' coaching staff as a special teams coaching assistant under then-Patriots head coach Pete Carroll in 1998. Carroll was fired following the 1999, but Jackson stayed on with new head coach Bill Belichick's coaching staff as a special teams and running backs coaching assistant through 2000. In 2001, Jackson rejoined Carroll, then the head coach at the University of Southern California, as the school's director of football operations and assistant athletic director, a position he held through 2005. In 2006, Jackson served as Executive Senior Associate Director of Athletics at Syracuse University before being hired as Vice President of Athlete Development at the boxing development firm A2 Holdings. In 2007, Jackson was hired by Oakland Raiders coach Lane Kiffin as the team's director of football development. On December 15, 2008, Raiders head coach Tom Cable announced that Jackson had been relieved of his duties amid a public departure of Raider assistant James Cregg who joined Kiffin's staff at the University of Tennessee.

References

External links
 Villanova profile

1972 births
Living people
American football defensive backs
Colby Mules football players
Oakland Raiders coaches
New England Patriots coaches
Trinity Bantams football coaches
USC Trojans football coaches
Villanova Wildcats athletic directors
Xaverian Brothers High School alumni
Sportspeople from Boston